C. diffusa  may refer to:
 Chorizanthe diffusa, the diffuse spineflower, a flowering plant species endemic to California
 Canscora diffusa, a plant species

See also
 List of Latin and Greek words commonly used in systematic names#D